Talageh-ye Sofla (also Romanized as Ţalāgeh-ye Soflá) is a village in Soviren Rural District, Cham Khalaf-e Isa District, Hendijan County, Khuzestan Province, Iran. At the 2006 census, its population was 95, in 23 families.

References 

Populated places in Hendijan County